Arthur Thalasso (November 26, 1883 – February 13, 1954) was an American stage actor of vaudeville and musical comedy in the 1910s and, subsequently, a screen actor. He appeared in more than 70 films between 1919 and 1945. He was born the son of German immigrants Frank Thalasso (1852-1895) and Pauline Thalasso (1848-1919) in Cincinnati, Ohio, and died at Harbor General Hospital in Torrance, California.

Selected filmography

 La La Lucille (1920) - Janitor
 The Forbidden Thing (1920) - Joe Portega
 The Kid (1921) - Car Thief with gun (uncredited)
 Children of Darkness (1921) - Vance
 Little Lord Fauntleroy (1921) - The Stranger
 The Sign of the Rose (1922) - Detective Lynch
 Black Gold (1924) - Tim Endicott
 Wine (1924) - Amoti
 Secrets of the Night (1924) - Detective Reardon (uncredited)
 The Movies (1925, Short) - The Villain - Bull Buckley
 The Strong Man (1926) - 'Zandow the Great'
 The Buckaroo Kid (1926) - Bodyguard (uncredited)
 Venus of Venice (1927) - Ludvico
 Horse Shoes (1927) - Conductor
 Speedy Smith (1927) - James Mortimer Dorfee
 Three's a Crowd (1927) - Harry's Boss
 A Perfect Gentleman (1928) - Ship's Officer
 Top Sergeant Mulligan (1928)
 Out with the Tide (1928) - Clancey
 Into the Night (1928) - Pat Shannon
 The Avenging Rider (1928) - Dance professor
 Air Police (1931) - Panama Joe
 The Secret Six (1931) - Stockyard Worker (uncredited)
 The Cheyenne Cyclone (1931) - Hoffman - Hotel Manager (uncredited)
 The Impatient Maiden (1932) - Neighbor (uncredited)
 Two-Fisted Law (1932) - Jake - Bartender (uncredited)
 The Reckless Rider (1932) - Bartender
 My Pal, the King (1932) - Council Member (uncredited)
 Trapped in Tia Juana (1932) - Billy - Bank Guard
 Lucky Larrigan (1932) - Bartender (uncredited)
 The Fugitive (1933) - Courtroom Attendant (uncredited)
 Her Forgotten Past (1933) - Police Detective (uncredited)
 Secret Sinners (1933) - Policeman (uncredited)
 The Kennel Murder Case (1933) - Detective (uncredited)
 Viva Villa! (1934) - Butcher (uncredited)
 Burn 'Em Up Barnes (1934, Serial) - Detective [Ch. 5, 10] (uncredited)
 Blind Date (1934) - Man at Gate (uncredited)
 The Moonstone (1934) - Detective (uncredited)
 Lady by Choice (1934) - Bouncer (uncredited)
 The Firebird (1934) - Policeman (uncredited)
 I Am a Thief (1934) - Jewel Guard (uncredited)
 Mills of the Gods (1934) - Guard
 When a Man's a Man (1935) - Bartender (uncredited)
 The Whole Town's Talking (1935) - Gatekeeper (uncredited)
 Big Calibre (1935) - Butch (uncredited)
 Border Brigands (1935) - 2nd Bartender (uncredited)
 Girl in the Case (1935)
 Branded a Coward (1935) - Man Who Calls Johnny a Coward (uncredited)
 Westward Ho (1935) - Bartender (uncredited)
 Tumbling Tumbleweeds (1935) - Blacksmith (uncredited)
 Thunder Mountain (1935) - Bartender (uncredited)
 The Ivory-Handled Gun (1935) - 3rd Bartender (uncredited)
 Escape from Devil's Island (1935) - Adjutant (uncredited)
 Midnight Phantom (1935) - Police Officer (uncredited)
 The Cheyenne Tornado (1935) - Bartender (uncredited)
 Border Caballero (1936) - Bartender (uncredited)
 The Millionaire Kid (1936) - Morley
 Lightnin' Bill Carson (1936) - Blacksmith Joe (uncredited)
 Winds of the Wasteland (1936) - Race Starter (uncredited)
 The Lion's Den (1936) - Bartender (uncredited)
 Prison Shadows (1936) - Coroner (uncredited)
 Anthony Adverse (1936) - Italian Man (uncredited)
 Cain and Mabel (1936) - Nero (uncredited)
 The Charge of the Light Brigade (1936) - Sepoy (uncredited)
 Wild Brian Kent (1936) - Flunky (uncredited)
 Law and Lead (1936) - Bartender Johnny (uncredited)
 Park Avenue Logger (1937) - Contest Official (uncredited)
 Behind the Headlines (1937) - Bartender Johnny
 A Day at the Races (1937) - Policeman Pursuing Hugo (uncredited)
 Slaves in Bondage (1937) - Police Dispatcher (uncredited)
 State Police (1938) - Bartender (uncredited)
 The Amazing Dr. Clitterhouse (1938) - Forensic (uncredited)
 Honor of the West (1939) - Rodeo Announcer
 Mystery Plane (1939) - Detective (uncredited)
 Zenobia (1939) - Townsman (uncredited)
 Mr. Smith Goes to Washington (1939) - Doorman (uncredited)
 The Pal from Texas (1939) - Bartender (uncredited)
 The Honeymoon's Over (1939) - Doorman (uncredited)
 Florian (1940) - Peasant (uncredited)
 Wagons Westward (1940) - Bartender (uncredited)
 Three Men from Texas (1940) - Bartender (uncredited)
 Tall, Dark and Handsome (1941) - Santa Claus (uncredited)
 Border Vigilantes (1941) - Bartender (uncredited)
 We Go Fast (1941) - Train Conductor (uncredited)
 Borrowed Hero (1941) - Turnkey (uncredited)
 Rolling Down the Great Divide (1942) - Bartender (uncredited)
 The Payoff (1942) - Police Officer (uncredited)
 The Boss of Big Town (1942) - Court Clerk (uncredited)
 Quiet Please, Murder (1942) - Air Raid Warden (uncredited)
 Hitler's Madman (1943) - Guard (uncredited)
 Nob Hill (1945) - Politician (uncredited)
 Ramrod (1947) - Barfly (uncredited)

References

External links

1883 births
1954 deaths
American male film actors
American male silent film actors
Male actors from Cincinnati
20th-century American male actors